The 2017 Manitoba Scotties Tournament of Hearts, the provincial women's curling championship of Manitoba, was held from January 25 to 29 at the Eric Coy Arena in Winnipeg. The winning Michelle Englot team represented Manitoba at the 2017 Scotties Tournament of Hearts in St. Catharines, Ontario, finishing second.

The event was most notable for the defeat of the defending Olympic champion Jennifer Jones rink in the semifinal. Jones lost to Darcy Robertson who proceeded to lose to the Michelle Englot rink in the final. Englot, who is a resident of Regina, Saskatchewan had won seven provincial titles in her home province, but joined her new Winnipeg-based team in the 2016 off season, replacing their previous skip Kristy McDonald who had lost in the final of the 2016 Manitoba Scotties Tournament of Hearts. It was the first provincial title for Englot's third, Kate Cameron, while second Leslie Wilson-Westcott and lead Raunora Westcott won their third provincial titles.

Jennifer Jones' loss in the semifinal would mark the first time since 2004 that she would not win a provincial tournament she had participated in. Jones cited a number of factors for her team's loss stating "the ice was tricky today ... draw shots were harder and it was a struggle with draw weight for everybody". Jones' semifinal loss was her second in a row, after having won all seven of her round robin games.

After the event, Jones was awarded as the tournament's all-star skip, Cameron was named all-star third, Vanessa Foster (Team Robertson) was named all-star second and Mariah Mondor (Team Birchard) was named all-star lead.

Teams
The defending Olympic champion Jennifer Jones rink was the top seed ahead of the event. They had not played in the 2016 provincial Scotties, as they had an automatic berth to the 2016 Scotties Tournament of Hearts as Team Canada for having won the 2015 Scotties Tournament of Hearts. 2016 provincial champion Kerri Einarson was given the second seed, while eventual-winner Michelle Englot was given the third seed.

The teams are listed as follows:

Round robin standings

Scores
Draw 1
Brown 10-5 Briscoe
Meilleur 7-4 MacKay
Jones 9-3 Reed
Birchard 9-2 Kilgallen

Draw 2
Overton-Clapham 8-5 McLean
Englot 9-8 Menard
Einarson 5-3 Armit
Peterson 7-6 Robertson

Draw 3
Jones 8-5 MacKay
Brown 9-4 Kilgallen
Briscoe 7-3 Birchard
Reed 8-6 Meilleur

Draw 4
Menard 8-3 Einarson
Peterson 9-6 Overton-Clapham
Robertson 13-7 McLean
Englot 11-4 Armit

Draw 5
Meilleur 8-6 Kilgallen
Birchard 11-1 Reed
MacKay 9-5 Brown
Jones 10-0 Briscoe

Draw 6
Englot 7-2 Peterson
Robertson 8-2 Armit
Overton-Clapham 9-5 Menard
Einarson 10-3 McLean

Draw 7
Reed 11-6 Brown
Jones 10-0 Kilgallen
Meilleur 6-1 Briscoe
MacKay 8-7 Birchard

Draw 8
Overton-Clapham 10-3 Armit
Einarson 7-3 Peterson
Englot 8-3 McLean
Robertson 8-6 Menard

Draw 9
Englot 6-5 Robertson
Menard 12-4 McLean
Peterson 8-6 Armit
Einarson 9-5 Overton-Clapham

Draw 10
Birchard 7-4 Meilleur
Briscoe 6-5 MacKay
Reed 10-5 Kilgallen
Jones 8-4 Brown

Draw 11
Menard 9-3 Armit
Robertson 6-5 Overton-Clapham
Einarson 7-3 Englot
McLean 7-5 Peterson

Draw 12
Reed 6-5 MacKay
Birchard 9-8 Brown
Jones 9-5 Meilleur
Kilgallen 8-7 Briscoe

Draw 13
Robertson 10-5 Einarson
Armit 10-1 McLean
Peterson 6-3 Menard
Overton-Clapham 8-4 Englot

Draw 14
Jones 8-6 Birchard
Briscoe 7-6 Reed
MacKay 10-5 Kilgallen
Brown 9-2 Meilleur

Tiebreakers
Birchard 11-4 Reed
Robertson 12-3 Einarson

Playoffs

R1 vs B1
Saturday, January 28, 7:45 pm

R2 vs B2
Saturday, January 28, 7:45 pm

Semifinal
Sunday, January 29, 9:00 am

Final
Sunday, January 29, 3:00 pm

References

Saskatchewan's Michelle Englot wins Manitoba Scotties

2017 Scotties Tournament of Hearts
 Scotties Tournament of Hearts
 Scotties Tournament of Hearts, 2017
January 2017 sports events in Canada